Mirette on the High Wire is a children's picture book written and illustrated by Emily Arnold McCully. Published in 1992, the book tells the story of Mirette, a French girl who learns to walk on the tightrope. McCully won the 1993 Caldecott Medal for her illustrations.

Plot summary
Mirette lives in a boarding house in France. One day her life is changed by a man named Bellini, a famous tightrope walker, who teaches Mirette how to walk on a tightrope.

Musical
Tom Jones and Harvey Schmidt, best known for their long-running off-Broadway musical The Fantasticks, created a musical version of the book in 1996.

References

External links

 plot&synopsis
 Past Productions at Goodspeed Musicals

Caldecott Medal–winning works
1992 children's books
Children's fiction books
American picture books